POSCO Chemical Co., Ltd., a subsidiary of POSCO, is a South Korean chemical company that produces refractories and basic industrial materials. POSCO Chemical's products were primarily refractories and burnt lime for POSCO's steel production but diversified its product range to basic materials, including materials for lithium-ion batteries.

Businesses
POSCO Chemical produces cathode active materials and anodes for EV batteries. In June 2022, POSCO Chemical and Britishvolt, a UK startup manufacturer of lithium-ion batteries, signed a deal to secure the cathode and anode materials supply. POSCO Chemical agreed with GM Motors to supply cathode active material for three years.

See also
 List of South Korean companies

References

External links
 

POSCO
South Korean companies established in 1971
Companies listed on the Korea Exchange